Saša Simić (born 22 April 1969) is a Serbian former footballer who played as a winger. He later became a sports agent.

Career
Simić started out with Sloboda Užice in the Yugoslav Second League and was teammates with Ljubinko Drulović in the 1988–89 and 1989–90 seasons. He later played for Borac Čačak, alongside Damir Čakar and Ivica Dragutinović, helping the club win the Second League of FR Yugoslavia in the 1993–94 season.

In the summer of 1994, Simić moved abroad to Portugal and signed with União Madeira. He was later transferred to Boavista, helping the side win the Taça de Portugal in 1997. The team included such players as Jimmy Floyd Hasselbaink and Nuno Gomes, among others.

After spending two seasons at Boavista, Simić switched to fellow Primeira Liga club Beira-Mar. He helped them win the 1998–99 Taça de Portugal, before returning to União Madeira for another three seasons.

Honours
Borac Čačak
 Second League of FR Yugoslavia: 1993–94
Boavista
 Taça de Portugal: 1996–97
 Supertaça Cândido de Oliveira: 1997
Beira-Mar
 Taça de Portugal: 1998–99

References

External links
 
 
 

Association football midfielders
Boavista F.C. players
C.F. União players
Expatriate footballers in Portugal
First League of Serbia and Montenegro players
FK Borac Čačak players
FK Sloboda Užice players
Primeira Liga players
S.C. Beira-Mar players
Serbia and Montenegro expatriate footballers
Serbia and Montenegro footballers
Serbian footballers
Serbian sports agents
Sportspeople from Loznica
Yugoslav footballers
1969 births
Living people
Serbian expatriate sportspeople in Portugal